Joseph Burnett was a Royal Australian Navy officer.

Joseph Burnett may also refer to:

Joseph Burnett (educator)
T Bone Burnett (Joseph Henry Burnett III), musician
Joe Burnett, CFL cornerback
Joe Goodwin Burnett, American prelate of the Episcopal Church